Christopher Roy Chilton (25 June 1943 – 20 May 2021) was an English professional footballer who played in the Football League for Hull City and Coventry City.

Chilton was born in Sproatley, East Riding of Yorkshire.
Chilton played as an inside forward for Church League side Bilton, but after joining Hull City he played at centre forward. He is Hull City's all-time top scorer, with 222 goals in all competitions. He was renowned for his partnership with fellow striker Ken Wagstaff, the taller, unselfish Chilton proving to be the perfect foil to the stocky, more predatory Wagstaff. Both players were deemed unlucky not to gain international honours - although both played for an England league XI in representative games.

During Hull's 1965-66 successful Division Two promotion campaign Chilton scored 29 goals despite the presence of an egg-sized lump of fat behind a knee. He had an operation in the close season to remove it.

Despite numerous offers to move to other clubs - notably Tottenham Hotspur and Leeds United. Chilton remained loyal to his local club for the majority of his career. He finally left for a short spell at Coventry City which ended due to a back injury. There then followed a spell in South African football with Highlands Park FC (1974–1978) before he returned to the UK, taking up a variety of coaching positions at his beloved Hull City.

He was youth-team manager and responsible for the development of future England manager Steve McClaren and England international winger Brian Marwood amongst others. Another notable achievement was the mentoring which resulted in the development of hard-man striker Billy Whitehurst, who was eventually sold for a huge profit - having arrived from non-league football for a nominal fee.

Chilton eventually became assistant first-team manager under Colin Appleton and later Brian Horton and for a short-spell - also caretaker manager - following the sacking of Mike Smith. He was however eventually moved back to youth-team coach by Horton, who promoted Dennis Booth in his place.

Apart from a short spell as assistant manager at Lincoln City, Chilton had little to do with the game since, although he published his autobiography 'Chillo' in 2005. He was retired and lived in Thorngumbald, East Riding of Yorkshire.

Chilton later developed dementia, and died on 20 May 2021, aged 77.

References

External links
 

1943 births
2021 deaths
Footballers from the East Riding of Yorkshire
English footballers
Association football forwards
Hull City A.F.C. players
Coventry City F.C. players
Bridlington Trinity F.C. players
Highlands Park F.C. players
English Football League players
Deaths from dementia in the United Kingdom